"10:15 Saturday Night" is a song by British post-punk band The Cure. It was the B-side to their June 1979 single "Killing an Arab" as well as the opening track of their debut album Three Imaginary Boys. It was also released in France as a single, with the track "Accuracy" as the B-side. It has been performed live during most of their shows since its release, and was included in their live album Concert.

A promotional video, directed by Piers Bedford, was the band's first.

According to interviews in the booklet for the Deluxe Edition of Three Imaginary Boys, the demo of the song is what caught Chris Parry's attention in 1978 and led him to sign the band to his newly founded record company, Fiction. The track was written by Robert Smith at the age of 16 one evening while sitting at the kitchen table feeling "utterly morose" watching the tap dripping and drinking his dad's homemade beer. It was first performed as part of sets performed by Easy Cure at gigs around the band's local area of Crawley.

The song was sampled by Massive Attack on their cover of "Man Next Door" from their 1998 album Mezzanine.

References

Notes

Citations

Other sources
 Apter, Jeff. (2006). Never Enough: The Story of the Cure. Omnibus Press.  p. 63

External links
 

The Cure songs
1979 songs
Songs written by Robert Smith (musician)
Songs written by Michael Dempsey
Songs written by Lol Tolhurst